Mugi may refer to:
 Mugi, Jayawijaya, Indonesia
 Mugi, Gifu, a former town in Gifu Prefecture, Japan
 Mugi District, Gifu, a former district in Gifu Prefecture, Japan
 Mugi, Tokushima, Japan
 Mugi Line, a railway line in southeastern Tokushima Prefecture, Japan
 Mugi, Ethiopia, the major town of Anfillo
 MUGI, a pseudorandom number generator
 Nickname for Tsumugi Kotobuki, a fictional character of K-On!